Implosive consonants are a group of stop consonants (and possibly also some affricates) with a mixed glottalic ingressive and pulmonic egressive airstream mechanism. That is, the airstream is controlled by moving the glottis downward in addition to expelling air from the lungs. Therefore, unlike the purely glottalic ejective consonants, implosives can be modified by phonation. Contrastive implosives are found in approximately 13% of the world's languages.

In the International Phonetic Alphabet, implosives are indicated by modifying the top of a letter (voiced stop) with a rightward-facing hook: .

Articulation
During the occlusion of the stop, pulling the glottis downward rarefies the air in the vocal tract. The stop is then released. In languages whose implosives are particularly salient, that may result in air rushing into the mouth before it flows out again with the next vowel. To take in air sharply in that way is to implode a sound.

However, probably more typically, there is no movement of air at all, which contrasts with the burst of the pulmonary plosives. This  is the case with many of the Kru languages, for example. That means that implosives are phonetically sonorants (not obstruents) as the concept of sonorant is usually defined. However, implosives can phonologically pattern as both; that is, they may be phonological sonorants or obstruents depending on the language.

George N. Clements (2002) actually proposes that implosives are phonologically neither obstruents nor sonorants.

The vast majority of implosive consonants are voiced, so the glottis is only partially closed. Because the airflow required for voicing reduces the vacuum being created in the mouth, implosives are easiest to make with a large oral cavity.

Types
Implosives are most often voiced stops, occasionally voiceless stops. Individual tokens of glottalized sonorants (nasals, trills, laterals, etc.) may also be pronounced with a lowering of the glottis by some individuals, occasionally to the extent that they are noticeably implosive, but no language is known where implosion is a general characteristic of such sounds.

Voiced implosives
The attested voiced implosive stops are the following:

voiced bilabial implosive 
voiced dental implosive 
voiced alveolar implosive 
voiced retroflex implosive  (letter not explicitly IPA approved)
voiced palatal implosive 
voiced velar implosive 
voiced labial–velar implosive 
voiced uvular implosive 

There are no IPA symbols for implosive fricatives. Implosive fricatives are unknown, and implosive affricates unlikely. An implosive affricate  has been reported in Roglai, but more investigation may reveal that it is something different.

Voiceless implosives
Consonants variously called "voiceless implosives," "implosives with glottal closure," or "reverse ejectives" involve a slightly different airstream mechanism, purely glottalic ingressive. The glottis is closed so no pulmonic airstream is possible. The IPA once dedicated symbols  to such sounds, but they were withdrawn in 1993. They are now transcribed  or occasionally . Some authors use a superscript left pointer, but that is not an IPA symbol and has other uses.

The attested voiceless implosive stops are:

voiceless bilabial implosive 
voiceless alveolar implosive 
voiceless retroflex implosive 
voiceless palatal implosive 
voiceless velar implosive  (paraphonemic in English)
voiceless uvular implosive 
voiceless labial–velar implosive  (in Igbo per Floyd 1981)

Occurrence
In the world's languages, the occurrence of implosives shows a strong cline from front to back points of articulation. Bilabial  is the most common implosive. It is very rarely lacking in the inventory of languages which have implosive stops. On the other hand, implosives with a back articulation (such as velar ) occur much less frequently; apart from a few exceptions, the presence of the velar implosive  goes along with the presence of implosives further forward.

Implosives are widespread among the languages of Sub-Saharan Africa and Southeast Asia and are found in a few languages of the Amazon Basin. They are rarely reported elsewhere but occur in scattered languages such as the Mayan languages in North America, Saraiki and Sindhi in the Indian subcontinent. They appear to be entirely absent as phonemes from Europe and northern Asia and from Australia, even from the Australian ceremonial language Damin, which uses every other possible airstream mechanism.

Fully voiced stops are slightly implosive in a number of other languages, but this is not often described explicitly if there is no contrast with modal-voiced plosives. This situation occurs from Maidu to Thai to many Bantu languages, including Swahili.

A contrastive retroflex implosive  may also occur in Ngad'a, a language spoken in Flores, Indonesia.

More examples can be found in the articles on individual implosives.

Voiceless implosives are quite rare but are found in languages as varied as the Owere dialect of Igbo in Nigeria, Krongo in Sudan, the Uzere dialect of Isoko, the closely related Lendu and Ngiti languages in the Democratic Republic of Congo, Serer in Senegal, and some dialects of the Poqomchi’ and Quiche languages in Guatemala. Owere Igbo has a seven-way contrast among bilabial stops, and its alveolar stops are similar. The dorsal stops   do not seem to be attested in the literature as speech sounds, but  has been claimed for Kaqchikel. Lendu has been claimed to have voiceless , but they may actually be creaky-voiced implosives.

Some English speakers use a voiceless velar implosive  to imitate the "glug-glug" sound of liquid being poured from a bottle, but others use a voiced implosive .

References

Bibliography

 
 Demolin, Didier; Ngonga-Ke-Mbembe, Hubert; & Soquet, Alain. (2002). Phonetic characteristics of an unexploded palatal implosive in Hendo.  Journal of the International Phonetic Association, 32, 1–15.

 Maddieson, Ian. (1984). Patterns of sounds. Cambridge studies in speech science and communication. Cambridge: Cambridge University Press.